Alphonso Michael "Mike" Giardello Jr. is a fictional character from the television drama Homicide: Life on the Street. The character was played by Giancarlo Esposito.

Biography
Mike Giardello is an FBI agent who is the estranged son of Baltimore Police Lieutenant Al Giardello. He comes to Baltimore from Arizona when a family relative is killed to assist the BPD in their investigations. He applies for and gets a job as a liaison to the Homicide unit. Although his FBI resources often help the unit's cases, he and his father often clash over media leaks and a case where Mike gives case information to an FBI supervisor and it leads to the death of a key witness in a politically charged murder case. Mike is stunned when the FBI allows a mobster in Witness Protection who has murdered a Baltimore resident to take a lenient plea deal because he's needed for a major Mafia trial in Philadelphia, and later resigns from the Bureau. He was earlier left devastated when he was enlisted as a hostage negotiator when a deranged father was holding his son and daughter hostage, and the father ended up killing his son before committing suicide (though this episode aired after the one where he resigns from the FBI). In the series finale he talks of returning to the Baltimore streets, and the 2000 TV movie reveals that he has joined the BPD as a patrolman in hopes of earning a detective's shield.

Family
Mike Giardello appears as the middle child of Al and Joanne Giardello. He has two sisters Teresa and Charisse (who refers to him as Al Jr.) and at least one nephew by his sister Charisse. His great-grandmother Rosina is known to him as "Nonna". He was raised in Baltimore's Little Italy. Michael tends to have an estranged relationship with his father at first but is improved upon when he becomes an FBI liaison to the department. Michael remains proud of Al however mainly due to his accomplishments in blazing trails for African American officers in the BPD (Michael claims Al was one of the first black Lieutenants in the department and encourages Al to take the captain's position on the finale as a means of improving the bad relationship between the city's black community and the police department).

References

Homicide: Life on the Street characters
Fictional Federal Bureau of Investigation personnel
Fictional African-American people
Fictional Italian American people
Fictional Baltimore Police Department detectives
Television characters introduced in 1998